Kealia Pond National Wildlife Refuge is a coastal salt marsh along the south-central coast of Maui, Hawaii. The refuge is located between the towns of Kihei and Maalaea, on both sides of North Kihei Road, Route 31. The wetland is also a  bird sanctuary, home to 30 species of waterfowl, shorebirds, and migratory ducks, including the aukuu (black-crowned night heron, Nycticorax nycticorax hoactli) and the endangered  āeo (Hawaiian stilt, Himantopus mexicanus knudseni) and alae keokeo (Hawaiian coot, Fulica alai).  Kealia Pond was selected as a wildlife refuge in 1953, protecting an initial  of land. The refuge joined the National Wildlife Refuge System in 1992.

Description
By spring, water levels begin dropping and by summer, the pond shrinks to half its winter size, leaving a salty residue behind: this accounts for its name, "Kealia", meaning "salt encrusted place";  Coastal salt pans once produced the mineral from seawater. The low water levels cause a 98% dieback in the tilapia population, which can produce a foul stench in the area.

Kealia was once an ancient fishpond supplied with water from the Waikapu Stream in the West Maui Mountains and Kolaloa Gulch originating from Haleakalā.  Native Hawaiians may have raised awa (milkfish, Chanos chanos) and amaama (flathead mullet, Mugil cephalus) using a system of ditches and sluice gates to let nearby fish from Māalaea Beach into the pond.

Towards the west, the area between Kealia and the town of Māalaea contains another shallow pond and mudflats that are also used by the birds during the winter and spring flooding. When the mudflats dry out during the summer, the birds move to Kealia Pond.  This area was once a runway serving one of Maui's first airports, Māalaea Airport.  During World War II, Kealia Pond was used for training the 2nd and 4th Marine Divisions.

The site has hosted numerous vagrant birds, most notably Garganey, Curlew Sandpiper, Marbled Godwit, American Avocet, Spotted Sandpiper, and Eared Grebe.

Boardwalk

A new boardwalk and 14-stall parking lot opened on North Kihei Road on September 8, 2009.  The area encompasses the bird sanctuary next to Sugar Beach, open from 06:00 - 19:00, and is patrolled by private security.

Images

Notes

References

Howarth, F.G. (1998). "Preliminary assessment of the midge, Polypedilum nubiferum (skuse), problem at Kealia Pond National Wildlife Refuge (Diptera: Chironomidae)". [Unpublished report] submitted to Ducks Unlimited, Rancho Cordova, California. 

.

Further reading

External links

Official site
Kealia Pond National Wildlife Refuge: profile
Pacific Islands: Kealia Pond National Wildlife Refuge

Bird sanctuaries of the United States
Protected areas of Molokai
National Wildlife Refuges in Hawaii
Marshes of Hawaii
Protected areas established in 1953
Landforms of Molokai
1953 establishments in Hawaii